De Anza College is a public community college in Cupertino, California. It is part of the Foothill-De Anza Community College District, which also administers Foothill College in nearby Los Altos Hills, California. The college is named after the Spanish explorer Juan Bautista de Anza.

Academics 
The average class size at De Anza is 35, and approximately 2,800 students transfer per year. It also attracts a heavy international student population.

Puente Project 
The Puente Project is a program offered at De Anza that helps underserved students transfer to 4-year institutions. "Puente" means "bridge" in Spanish, which symbolizes the bridge the program builds for the students to reach higher education. Puente is made up of three key components: English, individualized counseling, and individual mentoring. Puente students transfer from De Anza at a much higher rate than non-Puente Latino students—61% of De Anza's Puente students transfer within six years.

Career Technical Education 
Applied Technologies
 Automotive Technology
 Design and Manufacturing Technologies: Industry level training in computer-aided design, computer machining, computer-aided manufacturing, and 3D printing/additive manufacturing.

Environmental Studies/Science Dept, offering associate degrees and vocational certificates in:
 Energy management & building science
 Environmental resource management and pollution prevention
 Facility and sustainable building management
 Wildlife science technician

Computer Technical Support 
This is an internship program that gives students an opportunity to gain hands on experience working with computers. Qualified students in this program may get a chance to work in paid industry-based internships like in the Information Technology departments at Roche Pharmaceuticals, Synopsys, Fujitsu Computer Systems, Fujitsu America, Flextronics, Photon Dynamics and VMware.  Students who are receiving financial aid are eligible to apply to receive a free refurbished computer. All donated computers are refurbished by interns in the program.

Vasconcellos Institute of Democracy in Action 
Formerly called the Institute of Community and Civic Engagement, this is the community service learning and civic engagement office.  VIDA coordinates Community Learning Partnership's work at De Anza. Its programs include:
 Internships
 Certificate for Leadership and Social Change
 LEAD (Latina/o Empowerment At De Anza)
 HEFAS (Higher Education for AB 540 Students)
 MYE (Mentors for Youth Empowerment)
 Youth Voices United for Change
 Public Policy School
 Campus Camp Wellstone
 Open Educational Resources

Established as the ICCE in fall 2005, It was initiated by then new president, Brian Murphy and was led by faculty members Jackie Reza and Cynthia Kaufman.  In 2015 the ICCE was renamed VIDA in tribute to John Vasconcellos. VIDA's director  is Cynthia Kaufman.

Buildings on campus

The Flint Center for the Performing Arts 

The Flint Center is De Anza's main theater, seating about 2,400 people, and hosts concerts, Broadway shows, dance and speaking events. Each year, De Anza invites several celebrities and dignitaries for public speaking engagements. Construction began in 1968 and the building was dedicated in 1971 as the Calvin C. Flint Center for the Performing Arts, named after the District Superintendent and first Chancellor, The Flint Center also has classrooms and was home to the Film and TV department in its early years.

Steve Jobs introduced the original Macintosh in a 1984 press conference (which was recreated in 2015 for the movie Steve Jobs) and the iMac in 1998.
The Foothill DeAnza Board has voted to close the Flint Center and tear it down. The last event in the facility was June 22, 2019.

Euphrat Museum of Art 
The mission of the Euphrat Museum of Art is to stimulate creativity and an interest in art among audiences of all ages.

Hank Baum writes in the California Art Review:"Established with a bequest by E. F. Euphrat in memory of his wife Helen, the gallery opened its doors in 1977. . . [it] is also the site for lectures, poetry readings, performances, discussions, and special community events.

"In addition, Director Jan Rindfleisch presents exhibits that address philosophical and social issues, challenge taboos, and allow artists to be resurrected who have been obscured by the prejudice of their day.

"The wide range of the gallery's interest is reflected in the titles of some past exhibitions 'Commercial Artists: Their Art,' '1981 International Year of Disabled Persons,' Men and Children,' 'The Workplace/The Refuge,' 'Realism in Painting and Color,' ' Survey of Bay Area Sculpture,' "It's Electric, ' ' Art that Rolls and Flies,' and the 'Lyle Tuttle Tattoo Art Collection'."Rita Felciano noted in her review of the 1987 The Power of Cloth,"The Euphrat... puts together exhibits from the outside—events that usually have some bite to them."

In the 1990 Art around the Bay: a guide to art galleries and museums in the San Francisco Bay Area Paul Monaco and Murwani Davis write:

California History Center in Le Petit Trianon 
The college is the home of the California History Center, housed in a mansion called "Le Petit Trianon".

Visual and Performing Arts Center 
The Visual and Performing Arts Center opened on March 6, 2009 and was built with an art exhibit and also a 400-seat performance and lecture hall that can be rented by De Anza College organizations and outside community groups.

Kirsch Center 
The Kirsch Center opened in 2005 and was the first community college building in the US to receive a LEED platinum rating.

A 17-year effort, the Kirsch Center was conceived and is operated by De Anza faculty, staff and students.

Over 100 environmental classes are taught in the Kirsch Center. In addition to classrooms and labs, students can work in self-paced programs at special open study stations throughout the building.

A few examples of what the building features are:
 Solar panel roof
 Advanced natural ventilation
 Raised floor for gentle air distribution and flexibility
 Natural day lighting
 Orientation and layout for energy efficiency and passive solar benefits
 Water conservation and water runoff control
 Radiant heating and cooling
 Native species landscaping

The building is a favorite location for policy makers, school officials, student groups, Silicon Valley entrepreneurs to visit and utilize for conferences and for tours.

The building was a 10 million dollar project that was funded by various groups including the student senate, Morgan Family Foundation, and Steve and Michele Kirsch Foundation.

Fujitsu Planetarium 
The Fujitsu Planetarium, with its 50-foot dome and seating for 139, teaches De Anza students, field trip groups, and the public. It also includes an evening musical laser light show on its Saturday public schedule from September to April. Its optical-mechanical projector was installed in 2007, and the new digital projection system was installed in 2016. The planetarium was built in the early 1970s and was named the Minolta Planetarium until 2008.

Outdoor artwork 
 "La Vita E Una Fontana" or "Life is a Fountain" by Salvatore Pecoraro December 1, 1991
 "Longevity Turtle" by Elwood Martin Reynolds, donated by Dr. and Mrs. Alvin Rutner
 "Time Graffiti" by David Middlebrook, 1997.  donated by Mrs. Rena Frabony DeHart in memory of De Anza College Founding President A. Robert DeHart.

Cheeseman Environmental Study Area  
This is a  natural garden containing some 400 species of plants representing 12 California natural communities. It is located next to the Kirsch Center on the southeast corner of campus, and it was built by a group of De Anza students and faculty in 1971, after having received a US$12,000 grant.

The 12 plant communities are:

 Freshwater marsh and pond
 Coastal sand dunes
 Coastal redwoods
 Foothill woodland
 Grassland
 Conifers
 Channel islands
 California desert
 Coastal sage scrub
 Chaparral
 Riparian
 Xeric display

Students and visitors can learn about California's natural heritage and see plants and animals in person. Students can also conduct environmental research here and deepen their appreciation for California's biological richness.

De Anza Associated Student Body 
The association is required by law to "encourage students to participate in the governance of the college". It participates in meetings sponsored by a statewide community college student organization named Student Senate for California Community Colleges. The statewide Student Senate is authorized by law "to advocate before the Legislature and other state and local governmental entities".

De Anza Flea Market 
The student body association also operates The De Anza Flea Market held on every first Saturday of a month. The flea market began as a small effort by the students of De Anza College to raise money for the student body over 30 years ago and has grown into an established community event attracting vendors and patrons from throughout the state. it is still a student enterprise with the De Anza Associated Student Body paying for all of the expenses and gaining approximately $300,000 annually for a variety of programs, services and events at De Anza College. The De Anza Flea Market contains about 825 vendor stalls and usually sells out very quickly. If the weather is good the flea market will draw approximately 15,000 to 20,000 shoppers.

New mascot 
In 2020, De Anza adopted a new mascot after students voted overwhelmingly the previous year to retire the Don, an outdated symbol that many students had never even seen. The Mountain Lion was chosen in December by the college mascot working group, which included DASB student representatives, student-athletes and coaches, after extensive input and campus-wide participation.

Police and crime 
De Anza College had its own campus police department, with unarmed officers dressed in slacks and polo shirts. The department was not a POST participating agency. In 2001, the campus police departments at De Anza and Foothill College were merged to become the Foothill-De Anza College District Police.

Averted shooting 
On January 29, 2001, Kelly Bennett, 18, an employee at a Longs Drugs store in San Jose, was developing photos for Al DeGuzman, 19, a De Anza College student, when she noticed that many of his photos were of guns and bombs as well as of DeGuzman himself posing with said weapons.  She called the police, who arrived at the store and waited for DeGuzman. He was arrested when he returned for his photos.

Shortly after DeGuzman's arrest, police executed a search warrant on DeGuzman's parents' home in San Jose, where he lived at the time. Inside DeGuzman's bedroom, police found bags filled with homemade explosives including Molotov cocktails and pipe bombs, as well as numerous guns, including a semi-automatic rifle and a cut-down 12-gauge pump-action shotgun. In addition, plans were discovered for a noon attack at De Anza the next day.

Over 10,000 students and over 1,000 staff were evacuated from De Anza the next day out of fear that DeGuzman had already possibly planted bombs on campus, although none were found. In the following weeks, Bennett was praised and credited with averting a massacre; she appeared on local news, Good Morning America and the Today Show.

DeGuzman was initially sentenced to seven years in prison after most of the charges were thrown out. However, appeals by prosecutors resulted in a resentencing of 80 years. Several months later, DeGuzman died in prison after hanging himself in his cell.

Rape investigation 

In 2007 the Santa Clara County Sheriff's Department investigated an inquiry into allegations of sexual assault of a 17-year-old female student arising from an off-campus party on March 4, 2007, by eight members of the De Anza College baseball team. On June 4, 2007, Santa Clara County District Attorney Dolores Carr stated that no charges would be filed. This decision was questioned by some, and the Office of the Attorney General was invited by the prosecutor to perform an independent investigation of the available evidence. May 2, 2008, the attorney general's determined that there was insufficient evidence to charge anyone present with a crime.

Athletics

Notable alumni 
Doug Cosbie, former National Football League tight end
Robertson Daniel, National Football League cornerback
Will Davis, Alliance of American Football cornerback
Mervyn Fernandez, former NFL wide receiver
Ron Gonzales, former mayor of San Jose
Teri Hatcher, actress
Steve Jobs, former CEO of Apple Inc., concurrently enrolled as a senior at Homestead High School
Anjelah Johnson, former National Football League cheerleader and comedian
Craig Juntunen, former Canadian Football League quarterback
Titus Kaphar, American contemporary painter and 2018 MacArthur Genius Award recipient 
Christina Kim, Ladies Professional Golf Association pro
Alexander Lee Eusebio, former member of popular South-Korean boy band, U-KISS
Evan Low, California Assemblyman for the 28th district
Jeannie Mai, host of the Style Network's popular and Emmy-nominated show, How Do I Look? and one of the co-hosts on The Real
Frank Manumaleuga, former National Football League linebacker
Joe Murray, Emmy Award-winning creator of Rocko's Modern Life and Camp Lazlo
DJ Patil, Former chief data scientist of the United States
Bill Pecota, former Major League Baseball player
Jeff Sevy, former National Football League offensive tackle
Paul Soriano, Filipino commercial and film director and producer
Jhonen Vasquez, cartoonist
Len Wiseman, film director
Steve Wozniak, American computer engineer, co-founder of Apple Inc.
Rock M. Sakura, Drag Performer
John Ottman, film composer and editor, received Academy Award for editing on Bohemian Rhapsody

See also 

 California Community Colleges system
 Cañada College, a community college located in Redwood City
 College of San Mateo, a community college located in San Mateo
 Evergreen Valley College, a community college located in San Jose
 Foothill College, a community college located in Los Altos Hills
 San Jose City College (SJCC), a community college located in San Jose
 Skyline College, a community college located in San Bruno
 West Valley College, a community college located in Saratoga

References

External links 
 Official website

 
Cupertino, California
Universities and colleges in Santa Clara County, California
California Community Colleges
Educational institutions established in 1967
1967 establishments in California
Two-year colleges in the United States